Edwin Rene Murray, known as Ed Murray (born August 6, 1960) is an American lawyer and Democratic politician from New Orleans, Louisiana. From 2005 to 2016, he served in the  Louisiana State Senate from District 4 in Orleans Parish.

A native and lifelong New Orleans resident, Murray graduated from John F. Kennedy High School and then studied at Loyola University, where he earned in 1982 a Bachelor of Arts in political science and in 1985 a Juris Doctor degree. From 1992 to 2004, Murray held the District 96 seat from Orleans Parish in the Louisiana House of Representatives.

Murray is a fellow of the Loyola University Institute of Politics. A partner in the general practice law firm of Murray, Darnell & Associates, Murray is a member of the African-American National Bar Association, the American Association for Justice, and the National Black Council of State Legislators. He is Baptist.

Late in 2009, Murray announced his candidacy for the 2010 election for Mayor of New Orleans, but he withdrew prior to the election.

Murray was term-limited in the 2015 elections and was succeeded in the Senate by Democrat Wesley T. Bishop.

References

External links
State senate page
Murray’s campaign for mayor

1960 births
Living people
Baptists from Louisiana
Democratic Party Louisiana state senators
Politicians from New Orleans
African-American state legislators in Louisiana
Democratic Party members of the Louisiana House of Representatives
Loyola University New Orleans alumni
Lawyers from New Orleans
21st-century African-American people
20th-century African-American people